The 1920–21 Yorkshire Football League was the 1st season in the history of the Yorkshire Football League.

Clubs

The league featured 13 new teams:
 Acomb, new entrant
 Bradford Park Avenue reserves, new entrant
 Dewsbury & Savile, new entrant
 Fryston Colliery Welfare, new entrant
 Goole Shipyards, new entrant
 Harrogate, new entrant
 Rowntrees, new entrant
 Selby Town, new entrant
 Wakefield City, new entrant
 Wath Athletic, new entrant
 Wombwell, new entrant
 Yorkshire Amateur, new entrant
 York YMCA, new entrant

Map

League table

References

1920–21 in English football leagues
Yorkshire Football League